Pernil (pernil asado, pernil al horno, roast pork butt) is a slow-roasted marinated pork leg or pork shoulder.  In Latin American countries the dish is commonly shared during Christmas. It is a typically accompanied by arroz.

The pork shoulder is used as a whole piece, with skin and bone. It is marinated the day prior to roasting with sofrito, salt and pepper, plus possibly additional spices (oregano and adobo). Sofrito is placed deep within the meat through small cuts. After marination the covered meat is slowly roasted initially in the oven for several hours, and, in the final phase, at a higher temperature with the cover off to get the skin crisp. When finished, the meat falls off the bone, and the crisp skin (cuero) is separated, cleared of fat, and can be served separately as cueritos (skin chips).

See also 
 Jokbal

References

Pork
Cuban cuisine
Ecuadorian cuisine
Dominican Republic cuisine
Puerto Rican cuisine
Venezuelan cuisine
Christmas food